Robin Mat(t)hews may refer to:
Robin Matthews (politician), United Kingdom leader of the European party Libertas
Robin Matthews (economist) (1927–2010), economist and chess problemist
Robin Matthews (cricketer) (born 1944), English cricketer
Robin Mathews (poet) (born 1931), Canadian poet, professor, and political activist
Robin Mathews (make-up artist)
Robin Matthews (Emmerdale), fictional character on ITV soap opera Emmerdale